Margus Prangel (born on 7 July 1974 in Tallinn) is an Estonian actor.

In 2000 he graduated from the Estonian Academy of Music and Theatre. From 2000 until 2011, he worked at the Estonian Drama Theatre. Since 2011, he has been a freelancer actor. Besides theatre roles he has also appeared in films and television series.

Filmography

 2001: Head käed 
 2004: Täna öösel me ei maga
 2006: The Power of Fear
 2007: Klass
 2008: Mina olin siin 
 2016: Päevad, mis ajasid segadusse
 2017: Heleni sünnipäev 
 2017: November 
 2019: ENSV 	
 2019: Tõde ja õigus
 2021: Firebird
 2022: Apteeker Melchior. Timuka tütar

References

Living people
1974 births
Estonian male stage actors
Estonian male film actors
Estonian male television actors
20th-century Estonian male actors
Estonian Academy of Music and Theatre alumni
Male actors from Tallinn